Natalie Glebova (born Natalya Vladimirovna Glebova; 11 November 1981) is a Russian-Canadian television host, author, dancer, model and beauty queen who was crowned Miss Universe 2005. Glebova had previously been crowned Miss Universe Canada 2005.

Early life and education

Glebova was born in Tuapse, Russia, to parents Vladimir Slezin and Anna Glebova. While in Russia, Vladimir worked as a radio communications specialist in the merchant marine industry, while Anna was a high school teacher. Glebova grew up as an only child. As a child, Glebova studied classical piano and competed in rhythmic gymnastics. At age 13, Glebova and her family left Russia and settled in Toronto, Ontario, Canada. After arriving in Canada, her parents found employment as software specialists.

After graduating from high school (central, in London Ontario), Glebova worked as a professional model in Toronto and received a Bachelor of Commerce in information technology management and marketing from Ryerson University. Prior to competing in pageantry, Glebova worked as a motivational speaker for elementary and high school students.

Career

Pageantry

Miss Universe Canada

In 2004, Glebova began her pageantry career while competing in Miss Universe Canada 2004, where she placed as the third runner-up behind eventual winner Venessa Fisher. Glebova returned the following year and won the Miss Universe Canada 2005 title.

Miss Universe

As Miss Universe Canada 2005, Glebova earned the right to represent Canada in the Miss Universe 2005 pageant, to be held in Bangkok, Thailand. Glebova became the fourth Canadian in ten years to advance to the semi-finals, eventually advancing to the top five along with Cynthia Olavarria of Puerto Rico, Laura Elizondo of Mexico, Renata Sone of Dominican Republic, and Monica Spear of Venezuela. Throughout the contest, Glebova gave a traditional Thai greeting known as a "Wai" on every appearance which helped her win over Thai audiences and judges. At the conclusion of the pageant, Glebova was crowned Miss Universe 2005 by outgoing titleholder Jennifer Hawkins of Australia.  Glebova's win was Canada's second after Karen Dianne Baldwin had been crowned Miss Universe 1982. 

As Miss Universe, Glebova traveled extensively and immersed herself in a campaign to increase awareness of HIV and AIDS, the ongoing platform of the Miss Universe titleholder. She attended the G8 Summit in New York City on 11 August 2005, which reflected on ending poverty in underdeveloped regions, and ending gang activity and drug cartels in Colombia. In November, Glebova attended a special Hindustan Times Leadership Summit in Delhi, India, and was on a week-long tour of several Indian cities on an AIDS Awareness Program. In December, she attended the national pageants of Puerto Rico and the Dominican Republic before going back to Thailand to commemorate the one-year anniversary of the 2004 tsunami tragedy.

During Glebova's official homecoming to her hometown of Toronto, the Miss Universe was formally offered an apology by the city's mayor David Miller after she was barred from attending a "Tastes of Thailand" festival while wearing her sash and tiara nor being introduced as a beauty titleholder. A 1990 bylaw, which prevents sexual stereotyping of  women in public events, was strictly enforced and largely criticized by Miller and Miss Universe Organization president Paula Shugart. Shugart called the episode an "insult" to not only Glebova, but to the Thai government who named her an "honorary tourism ambassador". According to Shugart, this was the first time in Miss Universe's history that a titleholder was uninvited from a public event. The same bylaw was once invoked to bar Barenaked Ladies from a public concert at Nathan Phillips Square due to their name.

During her reign, Glebova traveled to Africa in July to attend an AIDS Educational Tour with the Global Health Council, Malaysia in late September, the Bahamas and St. Martin. In late March 2006, Glebova visited Russia for the first time since leaving the country in her pre-teens. She participated in an HIV-AIDS Awareness campaign in Moscow and attended a Russian fashion show as a special guest. She also made numerous trips to Thailand, where she commemorated the anniversary of the tsunami and Canada, her home nation.

She also attended the national pageants of Ukraine in mid October, Puerto Rico in November, Dominican Republic in December, Czech Republic in February, Thailand and Nicaragua in March, Brazil in April. She also crowned  Alice Panikian as her Miss Universe Canada successor the night of March 21, 2006. Alice finished 6th in Miss Universe.

Glebova was supposed to travel to Indonesia to crown Miss Indonesia Universe 2006 in late July, but because of Canada's travel ban to the Southeast Asian country, Glebova was officially replaced with Puerto Rico's Cynthia Olavarria, the First Runner-Up of Miss Universe 2005. Since the Miss Indonesia pageant's revival in 2000, this was the first time in which Miss Universe was unable to attend the coronation.

On July 23, 2006 Glebova crowned Zuleyka Rivera of Puerto Rico as her successor in Los Angeles.

Post-pageantry

After finishing her reign as Miss Universe, Glebova continued appearing as a brand ambassador and in public roles. In May 2006, it was announced that Glebova, along with golfer Vijay Singh and pro tennis player Paradorn Srichaphan, would become a brand ambassador for Thailand-based beer brewers Singha Corp. owners of Boon Rawd Brewery. Glebova completed her 1-year contract with Singha in July 2007.

In 2008, Glebova joined The Amazing Race Asia 3 and she partnered with Pailin Rungratanasunthorn. They represented Thailand and came in 8th place.

In December 2012, it was announced that Glebova will compete in reality TV show "Dancing with the Stars Thailand".
The first episode was aired on Channel 7 (Thailand) on January 8, 2013, at 10:30pm 

In May 2012, Glebova and French company Bel Perfumes based in Thailand released Glebova's first fragrance, Beauty Icon.

Glebova also serves as an ambassador for Soi Dog Foundation, a non-profit organization aiding homeless street animals in Thailand.

In June 2015, Glebova became an Ambassador for Year of the Gibbon for the IUCN SSC Primate Specialist Group - Section on Small Apes, to raise awareness for gibbon conservation. Glebova has a passion for wildlife conservation and recently launched a public awareness campaign about the impact of photo-prop tourism on gibbons Year of the Gibbon.

In 2018, Glebova partnered with a California attorney and entrepreneur Dr. Patama Mokaves Dumas to start a program for high schools and universities called Empowered. The program's aim is to develop confidence and positive thinking of young people so they can happily achieve their life goals. They are teaching a course titled “Empowered YOU” at Bangkok University since 2018.

Personal life

In 2006, Glebova began dating Thai professional tennis player Paradorn Srichaphan, whom she met at the 2006 Thailand Open. They became engaged the following year, and married later in 2007 in Bangkok. The couple split up in early 2011.

Glebova married Panamanian entrepreneur, founder of Travelbook, Inc. and Mister Panamá 2001 Dean Kelly in 2016. They have one daughter together and reside in Bangkok, Thailand.

Published work

 February 2007, Healthy Happy Beautiful.
 November 2018, I Am Winning - A Guide to Personal Empowerment available on Amazon and in Asia Books Thailand.

Notes

References

External links

HHB Life - official web site by Natalie Glebova - inactive and archived.
Natalie Glebova - Magazines Gallery - inactive and archived.
Healthy Happy Beautiful - Book by Natalie Glebova

1981 births
Canadian expatriates in Thailand
Female models from Ontario
Canadian people of Russian descent
Living people
Miss Universe 2005 contestants
Miss Universe Canada winners
Miss Universe winners
Naturalized citizens of Canada
People from Toronto
People from Tuapse
Russian emigrants to Canada
Russian female models
Toronto Metropolitan University alumni
The Amazing Race contestants